Hypselophrum is a genus of flies in the family Stratiomyidae. It's only species is Hypselophrum cyphomyioides. It is found in Peru.

References

Stratiomyidae
Brachycera genera
Taxa named by Kálmán Kertész
Diptera of South America
Endemic fauna of Peru
Taxa described in 1909
Monotypic Diptera genera